Black Creek is a stream in the U.S. state of Georgia. It is a tributary to the Ogeechee River.

Black Creek's name is an accurate preservation of its native Creek name, Weelustee ("black water"). A variant name was "Weelustie Creek".

References

Rivers of Georgia (U.S. state)
Rivers of Bryan County, Georgia
Rivers of Bulloch County, Georgia